The New Humanity was  British new age magazine founded in February 1975  by the Dutch writer Johan Henri Quanjer (1934 – 2001). It styled itself as " the world's first politico- spiritual journal for the free & independent thinker" with the maxim " neither Left nor Right but Uplifted Forward." Its articles covered a wide range of New Age topics relating to the improvement of humanity through new consciousness awareness. It came to call its platform Pneumatocracy or rule of the spirit. It supported the European Union as a progressive force in the world. The magazine ceased publication in 2001 on the death of its founder.

References

External links
 Specimen article  "The Progene of Unity" by  James Traeger from New Humanity published in 2000. Pneumatocracy website. Retrieved July 2012
Archived sample article  ''An Outline of Transpersonal Principals''  by Martin S Fliebert, New Humanity Journal  No 71 October 1986. Held at Researchgate. Retrieved June 2021

1975 establishments in the United Kingdom
2001 disestablishments in the United Kingdom
Alternative magazines
Cultural magazines published in the United Kingdom
Monthly magazines published in the United Kingdom
Defunct political magazines published in the United Kingdom
Independent magazines
Magazines published in London
Magazines established in 1975
Magazines disestablished in 2001
New Age media
Western esoteric magazines